Enzo Martinelli (11 November 1911 – 27 August 1999) was an Italian mathematician, working in the theory of functions of several complex variables: he is best known for his work on the theory of integral representations for holomorphic functions of several variables, notably for discovering the Bochner–Martinelli formula in 1938, and for his work in the theory of multi-dimensional residues.

Biography

Life
He was born in Pescia on 11 November 1911, where his father was the Director of the local agricultural school. His family later went to Rome, where his father ended his working career as the Director-general of the Italian Ministry of Public Education. Enzo Martilnelli lived in Rome almost all of his life: the only exception was a period of nearly eight years, from 1947 to 1954, when he was in Genova, working at the local university. In 1946 he married in Rome Luigia Panella, also her a mathematician, who later become an associate professor at the faculty of Engineering of the Sapienza University of Rome, and who was his loving companion for the rest of his life. They had a son, Roberto, and a daughter, Maria Renata, who later followed her parents footsteps becoming also her a mathematician: four grandchildren completed their family.

Academic career
In 1933 he earned his laurea from the Sapienza University of Rome: the title of his thesis was "Sulle funzioni poligene di una e di due variabili complesse", and his thesis supervisor was Francesco Severi. From 1934 to 1946 he worked as an assistant professor first to the chair of mathematical analysis held by Francesco Severi and then to the chair of geometry held by Enrico Bompiani. In 1939 he became "Libero Docente" (free professor) of Mathematical analysis: he taught also courses on analytic geometry, algebraic geometry and topology as associate professor. In 1946 he won a competitive examination by a judging commission for the chair of "Geometria analitica con elementi di Geometria Proiettiva e Geometria Descrittiva con Disegno", awarded by the University of Genova: the second place and the third place went respectively to Giovanni Dantoni and Guido Zappa. Martinelli held that chair from 1946 to 1954, teaching also mathematical analysis, function theory, differential geometry and algebraic analysis as  associate professor. In 1954 he went back in Rome to the chair of Geometry at the university, holding that chair up to his retirement, in 1982: he also taught courses on topology, higher mathematics, higher geometry upon charge. In the years 1968–1969, during a very difficult period for the Sapienza University of Rome, he served the university as the director of the Guido Castelnuovo Institute of Mathematics.

He attended various conferences and meetings. In 1943 and in 1946 he was invited in Zurich by Rudolf Fueter, in order to present his researches: later and during all his career he lectured in almost all Italian and foreign universities.

He was also a member of the UMI Scientific Commission (from 1967 to 1972), of the editorial boards of the Rendiconti di Matematica e delle sue Applicazioni (from 1955 to 1992) and of the Annali di Matematica Pura ed Applicata (from 1965 to 1999).

Honors
While still attending the university, he won the Cotronei Foundation prize, and after earning his laurea, the Beltrami Foundation prize, the Fubini and Torelli prizes, and the Prize for Mathematical Sciences of the Ministry of National Education: this last one was awarded him in 1943, and the judging commission consisted of Francesco Severi (as the president of the commission), Ugo Amaldi and Antonio Signorini (as the supervisor of the commission).
In 1948 he was elected Corresponding Member of the Accademia Ligure di Scienze e Lettere: in 1961 and in 1977 he was elected respectively Corresponding and Full Member of the Accademia dei Lincei, and from 1982 to 1985 he was "Professore Linceo". Finally, in 1980 he was elected Corresponding Member of the Accademia delle Scienze di Torino and then, in 1994, Full Member. Also, in 1986, the Sapienza University of Rome, to which Enzo Martinelli was particularly tied for all his life, awarded him the title of professor emeritus.

Personality traits
He is unanimously remembered as a real gentleman, gifted by a caring attention, politeness, generosity and the rare ability to listen to colleagues and students alike:  and  remember long conversations with him on various mathematical research topics, and his disposability to give help and advice to whoever asked for it. In particular  recalls the time when he was his doctoral student at the University of Genova: they meet every Sunday in the afternoon at Martinelli's home, since Martinelli was not able to meet him during the week. During one of their meetings, lasting a little more than two hours, Martinelli taught him Élie Cartan's theory of exterior differential forms, and Rizza used successfully this tool in his first research works. Another episode illustrating this aspect of Martinelli's personality is recalled by Gaetano Fichera. When he was back in Rome in 1945, at the end of the Second World War, he exposed to Martinelli a theory identical to the theory of differential form: he developed it while being prisoner of the nazists in Teramo during wartime. Martinelli, very tactfully, told him that the idea was already being developed by Élie Cartan and Georges de Rham.

An excellent teacher himself, capable to arose curiosity and enthusiasm by his lessons, he admired and respected much his own: however, this was quite common for the Italian scientists of the same and the preceding generations, who were advised in the early days of their scientific career by some of the best Italian scientists ever. His doctoral advisor was Francesco Severi: other great Italian mathematicians where among his teachers. Guido Castelnuovo, Federigo Enriques, Enrico Bompiani, Tullio Levi-Civita Mauro Picone and Antonio Signorini were all working at the Sapienza University of Rome when Enzo Martinelli was a student there, following their lessons:  describes the activity of the institute of mathematics during that period as extremely stimulating.

Another central aspect of his personality was a deep sense of justice and legality: Martinelli was very careful in performing his citizen and university professor duties, and he was also ready to fight for his own rights and for the needs of higher education. Concerned by the growing interference of bureaucracy in university education, already in the 1950s he was heard by  complaining that: "In Italia mancano le menti semplificatrici". Martinelli was also free from every kind of authoritarianism to the point that when, during the protests of 1968 in Italy, many newspapers accused the Italian university scientific community of being so, all the assistant professors and students of Martinelli (and perhaps Martinelli himself) were perplexed. In the same period, while performing his duties as the director of the Guido Castelnuovo Institute of Mathematics at the Sapienza university of Rome, his rare intellectual honesty and rigorous rationality, according to Rizza, caused him troubles when dealing with many who "believed in everything except the cold light of reason".

Work

Research activity

He is the author of more than 50 research works, the first of which was published when Martinelli still was an undergraduate student: precisely, his research production consist of 47 papers and 30 between treatises, textbooks and various other publications.

Teaching activity
The aspects of his personality described before and his deep professional commitment also made him a great teacher: at least fifteen textbooks on geometry, topology, complex analysis testify his didactic activity. Those books appear as models of clarity and mathematical rigour, and also offer insights on more complex theories and problems to the clever student: indeed, it was one of Martinelli's concerns to teach mathematics showing its lively development and its attractiveness in term of interesting difficult problems offered, in order that no gifted student would abandon the idea to do mathematical research.

Selected publications
. The first paper where the now called Bochner-Martinelli formula is introduced and proved.
. In this paper, Martinelli proves an earlier result of Luigi Amoroso on the boundary values of pluriharmonic function by using tensor calculus.
. Available at the SEALS Portal. In this paper Martinelli gives a proof of Hartogs' extension theorem by using the Bochner-Martinelli formula.
. Available at the SEALS Portal.
. Available at the SEALS Portal.
. The concluding work of Martinelli on the theory of integral representations of holomorphic functions of  complex variables.
. This paper contains Martinelli's improvement of the solution of the Dirichlet problem for holomorphic functions of several complex variables given by  few years before: Martinelli relaxes the smoothness condition on the boundary of the given domain, requiring it to be only of class . However, the boundary value is required to be of the same class, smoother than class  data allowed by Gaetano Fichera.
.
. The notes form a course, published by the Accademia Nazionale dei Lincei, held by Martinelli during his stay at the Accademia as "Professore Linceo".
. In this article, Martinelli gives another form of the Martinelli–Bochner formula.

See also 
Almost complex manifold
Bochner–Martinelli formula
Complex manifold
Kähler manifold
Pluriharmonic function
Residue theorem
Several complex variables

Notes

References

Biographical and general references

.
, freely available from the Ministero per i Beni Culturali e Ambientali - Dipartimento per i Beni Archivistici e Librari - Direzione Generale per gli Archivi. The complete inventory of the Reale Accademia d'Italia, which incorporated the Accademia Nazionale dei Lincei between 1939 and 1944.
, available from the Accademia delle Scienze di Torino. The relation on the activity of the "Accademia" during the years 1998–1999 read by the president of the Turin Academy of Sciences.
. The story of the life of Gaetano Fichera written by his wife, Matelda Colautti Fichera. There is also a free electronic edition with a different title: .
. The Last Lesson of the course of higher analysis by Gaetano Fichera, before his retirement from university teaching in 1992.
.
. The biographical and bibliographical entry (updated up to 1976) on Luigi Amerio, published under the auspices of the Accademia dei Lincei in a book collecting many profiles of its living members up to 1976.
. A celebration article written by Giovanni Battista Rizza, his first former doctoral student, published in the proceedings of the conference .
. An obituary written Giovanni Battista Rizza, by his first doctoral student.
. The commemoration of Enzo Martinelli written by his first doctoral student.
. This is a monographic fascicle published on the "Bollettino dell'Unione Matematica Italiana", describing the history of the Istituto Nazionale di Alta Matematica Francesco Severi from its foundation in 1939 to 2003. It was written by Gino Roghi and includes a presentation by Salvatore Coen and a preface by Corrado De Concini. It is almost exclusively based on sources from the institute archives: the wealth and variety of materials included, jointly with its appendices and indexes, make this monograph a useful reference not only for the history of the institute itself, but also for the history of many mathematicians who taught or followed the institute courses or simply worked there.
. The personal reminiscences about his geometry teacher Enzo Martinelli, by Giuseppe Tomassini.
. This work describes the research activity at the Sapienza University of Rome and at the (at that time newly created) "Istituto Nazionale di Alta Matematica Francesco Severi"  from the end of the 1930s to the early 1940s.

Scientific references
. An epoch-making paper in the theory of CR-functions, where the Dirichlet problem for analytic functions of several complex variables is solved for general data. An English translation of the title reads as:-"Characterization of the trace, on the boundary of a domain, of an analytic function of several complex variables".
, (in Italian). Notes from a course held by Francesco Severi at the Istituto Nazionale di Alta Matematica (which at present bears his name), containing appendices of Enzo Martinelli, Giovanni Battista Rizza and Mario Benedicty. An English translation of the title reads as:-"Lectures on analytic functions of several complex variables – Lectured in 1956–57 at the Istituto Nazionale di Alta Matematica in Rome".

Proceedings of conferences dedicated to Enzo Martinelli
.
. The electronic proceedings of a conference on topics belonging to or related to André Lichnerowicz and Enzo Martinelli fields of research.

External links 
. The biographical entry about Enzo Martinelli the Enciclopedia Treccani.

1911 births
1999 deaths
People from Pescia
20th-century Italian mathematicians
Geometers
Complex analysts
Mathematical analysts
Members of the Lincean Academy
Academic staff of the Sapienza University of Rome